Prionosciadium humile is a species native to the Mexican state of Nuevo León. It is a biennial herb with trifoliate leaves, each leaflet palmately 3-lobed and almost cleft.

References

Apioideae
Endemic flora of Mexico
Flora of Nuevo León
Plants described in 1909